Biathle is a sub-sport of modern pentathlon invented to create opportunities for training the run and swim parts of pentathlon in real race conditions. It is a sport in its own right. It bears close resemblance to aquathlon which also contains swimming and running but comes from triathlon sport.

Sport
Biathle is an event that can involve a run―swim―run course, or simply a swim―run course.  It is a world class sport but not an Olympic one. The legs are raced with continuous transitions like triathlon. The race length is usually 200 m swim and 3 km run, which is shorter than aquathlon usually is. A variant is Winter Biathle which has indoor swimming and does not have continuous transitions.

Biathle World Championships
The Biathle World Championships have been held in September or October annually since 1999. The first event was held in Monaco, and returned there every two years between 2003 and 2009. Approximately 500 athletes have competed at each edition of the championships, representing some 50 countries.

Medallists

Men's Championship

Men's team championship

Women's championship

Women's team championship

Mixed relay Championship

Venue

External links
UIPM Biathle webpages
MODERN PENTATHLON 2013 COMPETITION RULES   BIATHLE RULES
Pentathlon GB Biathle webpages
Biathle Middle East
Biathle Turkiye 

Multisports
Modern pentathlon